A list of literary awards for books with queer content. This page uses the following acronyms, all of which may be considered synonymous:

 LGBT: Lesbian, gay, bisexual, transgender
 LGBT+: Lesbian, gay, bisexual, transgender, and other queer identities
 LGBTQ: Lesbian, gay, bisexual, transgender, questioning
 LGBTQIA: Lesbian, gay, bisexual, transgender, questioning, intersex, asexual

Awards

References 

Lists of awards lists
literary